Vitas Gerulaitis was the defending champion but lost in the final 6–3, 6–4 to John McEnroe.

Seeds

  John McEnroe (champion)
  Gene Mayer (semifinals)
  Vitas Gerulaitis (final)
  Wojciech Fibak (first round)
  John Sadri (quarterfinals)
  Johan Kriek (semifinals)
  Bill Scanlon (quarterfinals)
  Phil Dent (second round)

Draw

Finals

Top half

Bottom half

External links
 1980 Custom Credit Australian Indoor Championships draw

Singles